Antelope Park may refer to:

Canada
 Rural Municipality of Antelope Park No. 322, Saskatchewan, Canada

United States
 Antelope Island State Park, a state park in Utah
 Antelope Valley Indian Museum State Historic Park, a park in California